Hellinsia papallacta is a moth of the family Pterophoridae. It is found in Ecuador.

The wingspan is 23 mm. The forewings are ochreous and the markings are dark brown and ferruginous. The hindwings and fringes are brown-grey. Adults are on wing in December, at an altitude of 2,750 m.

Etymology
The species is named after the locality where it was collected, the town of Papallacta.

References

Moths described in 2011
papallacta
Moths of South America